The MacCormac family is a family of Northern Irish ancestry that originates in County Armagh, Northern Ireland. The MacCormac family produced four medical doctors and at least three members of the family received knighthoods during the nineteenth and early twentieth centuries. The family is of Ulster ancestry and perhaps also has some distant English ancestry through Colonel Joseph Hall of Hall Place, Lurgan.

History

The MacCormac family descends from the union of John MacCormac, (d. 1811), a prosperous linen merchant and Mary Ann Hall, (1766-1846), a wealthy heiress and daughter of Colonel Joseph Hall, a notable distiller in County Armagh. John MacCormac was the son of Cornelius MacCormac, a high-ranking naval officer who died after falling aboard a vessel.

The precise origins of the MacCormac family of County Armagh are unclear and it does not appear as though the family was of Scottish descent. The family may have descended from the family of Archbishop Cornelius MacCormac of Armagh, who was a clergyman in late seventeenth century Ireland. The origins of the Hall family are probably in England or Scotland, although the name may be an anglicised version of a traditionally Irish surname.

Medicine
The medical strand in the MacCormac family began with Henry MacCormac, (1800-1886), the son of John MacCormac and Mary Ann MacCormac. Henry MacCormac qualified as a medical doctor in Dublin, Paris, and earned a Medical Doctorate from the University of Edinburgh in 1824. It is primarily from Henry MacCormac's lineage that the notable MacCormac dynasty descend, although his elder brother, Hon. John MacCormac was the progenitor of the Easmon medical family, a West African medical dynasty. Dr Henry MacCormac married Mary Newsam, the daughter of William Newsam, a linen merchant, descended from an old English family that settled in Ireland in 1640.

Henry MacCormac and Mary Newsam MacCormac were the parents of Sir William MacCormac, 1st Baronet, the most decorated surgeon of the late nineteenth century, who served as Serjeant-Surgeon to King Edward VII. The grandson and namesake of Dr Henry MacCormac, was a dermatologist and the father of architect, Sir Richard MacCormac.

Notable members

The descendants of Henry MacCormac and Mary Newsam MacCormac include several medical doctors and other descendants who distinguished themselves in education, commerce, and the civil service during the nineteenth and early twentieth centuries. At least three members of the MacCormac family were knighted during the nineteenth and twentieth centuries, and at two others members of the family were decorated with civil honours.

Members of the MacCormac family include:
Henry MacCormac (physician), notable physician and man of letters
John MacCormac, pioneer of the African timber trade in Sierra Leone
Sir William MacCormac, Five-times President of the Royal College of Surgeons of England and Serjeant-Surgeon to King Edward VII
Henry MacCormac (dermatologist), CBE, (1879-1950), dermatologist and Lieutenant-Colonel in the Royal Army Medical Corps
Dr Henry Roy Dean, medical doctor and professor of Pathology at the University of Cambridge and Master of Trinity Hall, Cambridge
Sir Patrick Dean, (1909-1985), British ambassador to the United States
Sir Richard MacCormac, architect and founder of MacCormac, Pritchard, and James

Descendants of the MacCormac family in West Africa

The Easmon family of Sierra Leone descends from John MacCormac, (1794-1865), a prosperous timber merchant who was the elder brother of Dr Henry MacCormac, the nineteenth century physician. John MacCormac arrived in West Africa in 1816. He lived in the Gold Coast and Sierra Leone for over fifty years. MacCormac and his brother, Hamilton Edmund MacCormac, Esq., exported timber from Sierra Leone to Britain and established a prosperous business in the early nineteenth century.

Members of the Easmon family, a West African medical dynasty that partially descends from John MacCormac, (1794-1865), include:
John Farrell Easmon, coined the term Blackwater Fever and wrote the first clinical analysis of the disease 
Macormack Charles Farrell Easmon, OBE, notable physician and historian of Sierra Leone
Charles Odamtten Easmon, first Ghanaian to qualify as a Fellow of the Royal College of Surgeons of Edinburgh
Charles Syrett Farrell Easmon, CBE, distinguished microbiologist and medical administrator

Sources
Fraser, Ian, ‘Father and son--a tale of two cities’, Ulster Medical Journal, 1968 Winter Vol. 37 No. 1), pp. 1–39
Fraser, Sir Ian, ‘Sir Willam MacCormac and his times’, Thomas Vicary Lecture, Annals of the Royal College of Surgeons of England (1983) Vol. 65, pp. 339–346
Marshall, M.D., F.R.C.P. LOND., F.R.C.P.I., D.P.H., Robert, 'The Open Window', A Paper read to the British Tuberculosis Association at its Annual Meeting in Belfast, in June, 1948, pp. 188–199

External links
Froggatt, Peter, 'Henry MacCormac (1800 - 1886): Physician,' http://www.newulsterbiography.co.uk/index.php/home/viewPerson/2071
Magee, Karl, ‘Maccormac, Henry (1800–1886)’, Oxford Dictionary of National Biography, Oxford University Press, 2004 
'Henry MacCormac, b.1879 d.12 Dec 1950CBE MD Edin FRCP (1917)', http://munksroll.rcplondon.ac.uk/Biography/Details/2845

 
Irish families
Families of Irish ancestry
Irish medical families